The 1984 Texas Tech Red Raiders football team represented Texas Tech University as a member of the Southwest Conference (SWC) during the 1984 NCAA Division I-A football season. In their fourth season under head coach Jerry Moore, the Red Raiders compiled a 4–7 record (2–6 against SWC opponents), were outscored by a combined total of 212 to 200, and finished in eighth place in the conference.  The team played its home games at Clifford B. and Audrey Jones Stadium in Lubbock, Texas.

Schedule

References

Texas Tech
Texas Tech Red Raiders football seasons
Texas Tech Red Raiders football